Golf retailers sell golf clubs, golf apparel and shoes, and golf accessories.  They are sometimes called off-course shops if not located on a golf course. National golf retailers include Golfsmith, Golf Galaxy (owned by Dick's), Worldwide Golf Shops, Edwin Watts Golf, Golf Discount, and PGA superstores.

The industry has suffered in the last decade.  Dick's has scaled back its golf presence in its stores, Golf Galaxy has closed numerous stores.  There are a few regional golf retail stores that have developed a niche in club fitting that have done well: these include Miles of Golf in Ann Arbor, Michigan, and Cincinnati, Ohio, Cool Clubs (various locations), Hot Stix in Phoenix, Arizona, Haggin Oaks in Sacramento, California, Pro golf Discount and Puetz Golf Superstores in Western Washington, and Austad's Golf based out of Sioux Falls, South Dakota.

Golf equipment manufacturers